Owari may refer to:
 The Owari Mandarin orange, a widely cultivated fruit of Japanese origin
 Additional Japan-related topics:
 Owari House, a branch family of the Tokugawa clan that ruled Japan during the Edo era
 Owari Province, a former region in Japan
 Owari Domain, a feudal domain of Japan in the Edo period
 Owari or oware, a token-moving game